Bor language may refer to:
 Southeastern Dinka language
 Belanda Bor language